The 2019 Rink Hockey Continental Cup was the 39th season of the Continental Cup, Europe's roller hockey Super Cup, organized by the World Skate Europe - Rink Hockey.

Four teams from three federations played for the title on 28 and 29 September 2019 in Lisbon.

Portuguese club Sporting CP won their first title ever.

Teams

Bracket

References

External links
 2019 Continental Cup at CERH website
 Competition rulebook

Continental Cup (rink hockey)
Continental Cup
Rink Hockey
Rink Hockey